Kenneth Gordon Price (born 26 February 1954) is an English former footballer.

A striker, Price joined Southend United from non-league Dudley Town in 1976 but made only one appearance for the Essex club before moving on to Gillingham. He spent seven years at Priestfield Stadium and clocked up over 250 Football League appearances, scoring nearly 80 goals.

In 1983 Price moved on to Reading where he spent three years before dropping into non-league football with Basingstoke Town.

References

English footballers
Southend United F.C. players
Gillingham F.C. players
Reading F.C. players
1954 births
Sportspeople from Dudley
Living people
Dudley Town F.C. players
Basingstoke Town F.C. players
Association football forwards
English Football League players